Thout 2 - Coptic Calendar - Thout 4

The third day of the Coptic month of Thout, the first month of the Coptic year.  On a common year, this day corresponds to August 31, of the Julian Calendar, and September 13, of the Gregorian Calendar. This day falls in the Coptic season of Akhet, the season of inundation.

Commemorations

Feasts 

 Coptic New Year Period

Saints 
 The departure of Saint Theodora the Penitent of Alexandria

Other commemorations 
 A council is held in the city of Alexandria, during the papacy of Pope Dionysius (243 AD), in defense of the immortality of the spirit
 A great earthquake in Cairo, and Egypt (1112 AD)

References 

Days of the Coptic calendar